Pseudohermonassa tenuicula, known generally as the Morrison's sooty dart or hair-pin dart, is a species of cutworm or dart moth in the family Noctuidae. It is found in North America.

The MONA or Hodges number for Pseudohermonassa tenuicula is 10951.

References

Further reading

 
 
 

Noctuinae
Articles created by Qbugbot
Moths described in 1874
Moths of North America